Remscheid is a city in North Rhine-Westphalia, Germany. It is, after Wuppertal and Solingen, the third-largest municipality in Bergisches Land, being located on the northern edge of the region, on the south side of the Ruhr area.

Remscheid had around 109,000 inhabitants in 2015. At the end of 2019 it had 113,703 inhabitants.

Geography
Remscheid comprises four boroughs, Alt-Remscheid, Remscheid-Süd, Lennep, and Lüttringhausen.

Its highest point is the Brodtberg (378 m).

History
Remscheid was founded in the 12th century, but remained a small village until the 19th century. Early spellings for the city included Remissgeid (1217), Rymscheyd (1351), Reymscheyd (1487) and Rembscheid (1639). The economic growth of the entire Rhine-Ruhr region led to an increase of the population of Remscheid. Mechanical engineering and toolmaking were the main industries practised within the town. This is carried on today with the Hazet tool company which has two factories in Remscheid. Remscheid was part of the Prussian Rhine Province from 1822 to 1945.

On 31 July 1943, during the World War II, Remscheid was almost completely destroyed during a British bombing raid which caused a firestorm. This bombing raid was the final operation of RAF's Battle of the Ruhr involving 273 aircraft. During 14 and 15 April 1945, Remscheid was captured by the 78th Infantry Division (United States).

An A-10 Thunderbolt II crashed in the city on 8 December 1988. Six people died.

Demographics
As of 31 December 2019, the city's population was 113,703, of which 92,726 (81.6%) were German citizens and 20,977 (18.4%) were non-Germans (Ausländer); of the non-German population, the top 10 nationalities represented were as follows:

Politics

Mayor
The current Mayor of Remscheid is Burkhard Mast-Weisz of the Social Democratic Party (SPD), elected in 2014 and re-elected in 2020. The most recent mayoral election was held on 13 September 2020, and the results were as follows:

! colspan=2| Candidate
! Party
! Votes
! %
|-
| bgcolor=| 
| align=left| Burkhard Mast-Weisz
| align=left| Social Democratic Party
| 22,431
| 60.6
|-
| bgcolor=| 
| align=left| Heidemarie Alexa Bell
| align=left| Christian Democratic Union
| 9,710
| 26.2
|-
| 
| align=left| Peter Keck
| align=left| Pro Remscheid
| 1,908
| 5.2
|-
| bgcolor=| 
| align=left| Fritz Beinersdorf
| align=left| The Left
| 1,309
| 3.5
|-
| 
| align=left| Roland Kirchner
| align=left| W.i.R. Remscheid
| 877
| 2.4
|-
| 
| align=left| Bettina Stamm
| align=left| Real Remscheid
| 775
| 2.1
|-
! colspan=3| Valid votes
! 37,010
! 98.5
|-
! colspan=3| Invalid votes
! 548
! 1.5
|-
! colspan=3| Total
! 37,558
! 100.0
|-
! colspan=3| Electorate/voter turnout
! 85,783
! 43.8
|-
| colspan=5| Source: State Returning Officer
|}

City council

The Remscheid city council governs the city alongside the Mayor. The most recent city council election was held on 13 September 2020, and the results were as follows:

! colspan=2| Party
! Votes
! %
! +/−
! Seats
! +/−
|-
| bgcolor=| 
| align=left| Social Democratic Party (SPD)
| 12,718
| 34.5
|  0.3
| 20
|  1
|-
| bgcolor=| 
| align=left| Christian Democratic Union (CDU)
| 11,036
| 29.9
|  7.3
| 17
|  3
|-
| bgcolor=| 
| align=left| Alliance 90/The Greens (Grüne)
| 5,409
| 14.7
|  6.3
| 9
|  5
|-
| bgcolor=| 
| align=left| Free Democratic Party (FDP)
| 1,945
| 5.3
|  0.6
| 3
|  1
|-
| 
| align=left| Pro Remscheid (PRO)
| 1,870
| 5.1
|  0.7
| 3
|  1
|-
| bgcolor=| 
| align=left| The Left (Die Linke)
| 1,700
| 4.6
|  1.4
| 3
| ±0
|-
| 
| align=left| W.i.R. Remscheid (WIR)
| 1,092
| 3.0
|  1.5
| 2
| ±0
|-
| 
| align=left| Real Remscheid (Echt)
| 788
| 2.1
| New
| 1
| New
|-
| colspan=7 bgcolor=lightgrey| 
|-
| bgcolor=| 
| align=left| Alternative for Germany (AfD)
| 358
| 1.0
| New
| 0
| New
|-
! colspan=2| Valid votes
! 36,916
! 98.4
! 
! 
! 
|-
! colspan=2| Invalid votes
! 592
! 1.6
! 
! 
! 
|-
! colspan=2| Total
! 37,508
! 100.0
! 
! 58
!  6
|-
! colspan=2| Electorate/voter turnout
! 85,783
! 43.7
!  0.7
! 
! 
|-
| colspan=7| Source: State Returning Officer
|}

Main sights
 The Müngstener Brücke is a railway bridge crossing a valley and connecting Remscheid with the neighbouring town of Solingen. It is 107 m above the ground, making it the highest railway bridge in Germany. It was constructed in 1897 and originally named the Kaiser-Wilhelm-Brücke after Wilhelm I (whose 100th birthday would have been in 1897).
 The Eschbachtalsperre, the first dam built in Germany for the supply of drinking water is located here. It was built in 1891.
 The old city of the borough Lennep consists of 116 houses from 1756.

Twin towns – sister cities

Remscheid is twinned with:

 Ashington, England, United Kingdom
 Kırşehir, Turkey
 Mrągowo County, Poland
 Pirna, Germany
 Prešov, Slovakia
 Quimper, France

Notable people

Caspar Georg Carl Reinwardt (1773–1854), scientist
Gottfried Duden (1789–1856), writer
Oscar Schlitter (1838–1939), banker
Johannes Fastenrath (1839–1908), lawyer, writer and translator
August Gissler (1857–1935), adventurer and treasure hunter
Wilhelm Röntgen (1845–1923), discoverer of x-rays
Otto Jungtow (1892–1959), footballer
Otto Kuhler (1894–1977), American designer of locomotives
Hans Stammreich (1902–1969), German-Brasilian chemist
Teo Otto (1904–1968), stage designer
Wolfgang von der Nahmer (1906–1988), conductor
Gustav Adolf Theill (1924–1997), composer and musicologist
Karl Michael Vogler (1928–2009), actor
Wolfgang Seiler (born 1940), biogeochemist and climatologist
Peter Brötzmann (born 1941), free jazz saxophonist
Christel Frese (born 1944), athlete
Michael Bacht (born 1947), artist 
Frank Plasberg (born 1957), journalist
Wolfgang Tillmans (born 1968), photographer
Georg Wurth (born 1972), lobbyist and activist
Christiane Soeder (born 1975), German-Austrian cyclist
Robert A. Küfner (born 1988), entrepreneur, raised here
The Rotation (born 1996), professional wrestler

Gallery

References

External links

German Roentgen-Museum 
Official website 

 
Cities in North Rhine-Westphalia
Populated places established in the 12th century
Districts of the Rhine Province